Kakhaber Chkhetiani (born 24 February 1978) is a Georgian former professional football player and manager. 

His brother Zviad Chkhetiani is also a professional footballer.

Honours

Player
Torpedo Kutaisi
Erovnuli Liga (2): 1999–00, 2000–01
Georgian Cup (2): 1998–99, 2000–01

Manager
Torpedo Kutaisi
Erovnuli Liga (1): 2017
Georgian Cup (3): 2016, 2018, 2022
Georgian Super Cup (2): 2018, 2019

External links

1978 births
Living people
Footballers from Georgia (country)
Expatriate footballers from Georgia (country)
Expatriate footballers in Hungary
Expatriate footballers in Ukraine
Expatriate sportspeople from Georgia (country) in Ukraine
Expatriate footballers in Azerbaijan
Georgia (country) international footballers
Debreceni VSC players
Pécsi MFC players
SC Tavriya Simferopol players
Simurq PIK players
Ukrainian Premier League players
Azerbaijan Premier League players
Erovnuli Liga players
Nemzeti Bajnokság I players
FC Torpedo Kutaisi managers
FC Dinamo Tbilisi managers
Erovnuli Liga managers
Expatriate sportspeople from Georgia (country) in Azerbaijan
Association football midfielders
Football managers from Georgia (country)